Ghabir dam is located on the border of Chakwal District and Mianwali District of Punjab, Pakistan.

References

Dams in Pakistan
Chakwal District
Mianwali District
Dams in Punjab, Pakistan